Clarksville is a city and county seat of Red River County, Texas, in the United States in the northernmost part of the Piney Woods region of East Texas. As of the 2020 census, the city population was 2,857.

History

Clarksville was established by James Clark, who moved to the area in 1833 and laid out a town site. When Red River County was organized in 1835, Clarksville was chosen as the county seat, beating out the community of La Grange (later named Madras). Isaac Smathers  built one of the first houses, which was later owned by Charles DeMorse. The town was incorporated by an act of the Texas Congress in 1837, and within a few years it became an educational and agricultural center.

In 1841, John W.P. McKenzie, a Methodist minister, retired from serving as a missionary and moved to a former plantation about  SSW of Clarksville. Naming his new home Itinerant's Retreat, he soon began offering classes for boys who lived in the surrounding area. During that same year, 16 boys enrolled in classes in his home. There was more demand than he could accommodate in his home, so he had a log cabin to the plantation to serve as a more conventional school. As the enrollment grew, he added 3 large wooden buildings to serve as dormitories and opened the school to girls and boarding students. By 1854, McKenzie College had 300 students and 9 faculty members participating in a 10-month school year.

Before the American Civil War began, Rev. McKenzie's school was the largest institution of higher education in Texas during the 1850s, and trained almost all of the new Methodist ministers in the state. Although the school was always considered a Methodist institution, it actually continued to be owned by McKenzie. He tried to turn it over to the local Methodist Conference in 1855 and 1860, but each time the Conference declined to accept certain unspecified conditions, so the official transfer never occurred.

By the fall of 1861, most of the male students had already enlisted in the Confederate Army. In 1863, the school had only 33 students. The average number rose to 74 during the years 1864–1867. Unable to obtain sufficient financing to continue, Rev. McKenzie closed the school permanently on June 25, 1868.

In 1844, Clarksville Female Academy opened, after moving from Pine Creek, where it was originally founded in 1840. A Clarksville post office opened in 1846, and by 1838 there was semiweekly mail service between Clarksville and Natchitoches, Louisiana.

A frame courthouse was built in 1840, and replaced with a brick structure on the main square in 1850. A brick jail was built nearby in 1852.  The First Presbyterian Church was organized in Shiloh, Gregg County, Texas in 1838, but relocated to Clarksville in 1844. The Texas State Historical Society says this is "...among the oldest continually operating Protestant churches in the state."

The Texas State Historical Society also reports that Clarksville was the most important commercial center in this part of Texas from the late 1830s until the Civil War. By the time the war broke out, the city had a population of about 900.

Economic recovery from the Civil War was stimulated when the Texas and Pacific Railway reached Clarksville in 1872, bringing new settlers and new businesses. The 1870 census showed a population of 613. By 1885, the population had grown to about 1,200. The city could then boast of a new limestone courthouse, five white and two black churches, a Catholic convent, three schools, two banks, two flour mills, and a weekly newspaper, the Clarksville Times.

In 1914, the city had 3,000 residents and had added a waterworks, two newspapers, an ice plant, and an electric power plant. After that, outside events such as two world wars, the Great Depression, and increased competition from other cities (e.g., Dallas, Paris, Bonham, and Texarkana) had begun to slow Clarksville's growth. As shown by the census table, the population in 2000 was very near to that in 1920.

On November 4, 2022, a tornado outbreak occurred in Texas and Oklahoma, which produced a violent EF4 tornado near Clarksville.

Geography
Clarksville is located at  (33.611086, –95.052448).

Demographics

As of the 2020 United States census, there were 2,857 people, 1,428 households, and 854 families residing in the city.

As of the census of 2000, there were 3,883 people, 1,530 households, and 1,006 families residing in the city. The population density was 1,299.2 people per square mile (501.4/km2). There were 1,787 housing units at an average density of 597.9 per square mile (230.8/km2). The racial makeup of the city was 53.39% White, 42.18% African American, 0.21% Native American, 0.26% Asian, 3.01% from other races, and 0.95% from two or more races. Hispanic or Latino of any race were 7.29% of the population.

There were 1,530 households, out of which 31.4% had children under the age of 18 living with them, 42.3% were married couples living together, 19.1% had a female householder with no husband present, and 34.2% were non-families. 31.5% of all households were made up of individuals, and 16.8% had someone living alone who was 65 years of age or older. The average household size was 2.44 and the average family size was 3.04.

In the city, the population was spread out, with 26.8% under the age of 18, 8.6% from 18 to 24, 25.4% from 25 to 44, 18.9% from 45 to 64, and 20.3% who were 65 years of age or older. The median age was 37 years. For every 100 females, there were 85.4 males. For every 100 females age 18 and over, there were 78.7 males.

The median income for a household in the city was $23,655, and the median income for a family was $31,729. Males had a median income of $21,635 versus $16,189 for females. The per capita income for the city was $13,487. About 17.6% of families and 23.7% of the population were below the poverty line, including 39.2% of those under age 18 and 15.1% of those age 65 or over.

Education 
The area is served by the Clarksville Independent School District.

Notable landmarks

Notable people

 John B. Denton, was a preacher that lived here who is the namesake of Denton County and the City of Denton
 Stacey Dillard, a former American football player, played defensive lineman in the National Football League
 Euell Gibbons, author of cookbooks and foraging guides, proponent of natural diets, and television personality popular in the 1960s and 1970s
 William Humphrey was the author of National Book Award nominee Home from the Hill, which was made into a movie shot on location in and around Clarksville in the late 1950s
 John W. P. McKenzie, moved to Clarksville and founded McKenzie College, a private school with support from the Methodist Church, in 1841. The college closed in 1868, after financial losses due to the American Civil War
 Tommie Smith, set the world and Olympic records with a time of 19.83 seconds and became the 200-meter Olympic champion at the 1968 Summer Olympics, which were held in Mexico
 J. D. Tippit, a Dallas police officer, was shot and killed by Lee Harvey Oswald about 45 minutes after Oswald assassinated President John F. Kennedy
 Van Turner, discovered Dallasaurus turneri, a new genus and species of fossil marine reptile from the Cretaceous period of Texas, 92 million years ago
 Gary VanDeaver, is a Republican member of the Texas House of Representatives from District 1 and the former superintendent of the New Boston Independent School District in New Boston, Texas. He was reared in Clarksville and graduated in 1977 from Clarksville High School
 John Williams, is the author of Stoner and National Book Award co-winner Augustus

Climate
The climate in this area is characterized by hot, humid summers and generally mild to cool winters.  According to the Köppen climate classification system, Clarksville has a humid subtropical climate, Cfa on climate maps.

Notes

References

Cities in Texas
Cities in Red River County, Texas
County seats in Texas
Populated places established in 1833
1833 establishments in Mexico